Brookula nepeanensis is a species of sea snail, a marine gastropod mollusk, unassigned in the superfamily Seguenzioidea.

Description
The shell reaches a height of 1.4 mm.

Distribution
This marine species occurs off New South Wales and Tasmania, Australia.

References

 Seashells of New South Wales: Brookula nepeanensis
 Iredale, T. (1912). New generic names and new species of marine Mollusca. Proceedings of the Malacological Society of London. 10(3): 217-228, pl. 9
 Cotton, B.C., 1945 . Southern Australian Gastropoda. Part 1. Streptoneura. Trans. R. Soc. SA, 69(1):150-171
 Cotton, B. C., 1959. South Australian Mollusca. Archaeogastropoda . W.L. Hawes, Adelaide.. 449 pp., 1 pl

External links
 To Biodiversity Heritage Library (1 publication)
 To World Register of Marine Species
 

nepeanensis
Gastropods described in 1906